Ion Tănăsescu (February 23, 1892 – December 28, 1959) was a Romanian chemist.

He discovered the Lehmstedt-Tanasescu reaction, which was improved by Kurt Lehmstedt. He studied at the University of Bucharest and the University of Cluj. He was elected a titular member of the Romanian Academy in 1955.

1892 births
1959 deaths
Scientists from Bucharest
Romanian chemists
Titular members of the Romanian Academy
Members of the Romanian Academy of Sciences